Skinningrove railway station was on the Whitby, Redcar and Middlesbrough Union Railway. It was opened on 1 April 1875, and served the villages of Skinningrove and Carlin How in North Yorkshire, England. It was originally named "Carlin How", but was renamed on 1 October 1903 by the North Eastern Railway. It had no goods service, but a zig zag track branched off just outside the station from a point on the main line towards Saltburn, serving the Loftus Mines in the valley below, where ironstone was mined. This closed in 1958. Further north towards Brotton, near the village of Carlin How, the tracks serving Skinningrove Steelworks branch off the line.
  
Skinningrove station closed to regular passenger traffic on 30 June 1952, but retained a workmen's service to the Skinningrove Steelworks until 5 May 1958. Very little remains of the former station.

References

External links
 Skinningrove station on navigable 1955 O. S. map

Disused railway stations in Redcar and Cleveland
Former North Eastern Railway (UK) stations
Railway stations in Great Britain opened in 1875
Railway stations in Great Britain closed in 1958
Loftus, North Yorkshire